Wawrzyniec Cyl (July 2, 1900 – February 7, 1974) was a Polish footballer (striker or defender) who played all of his career in ŁKS Łódź. He played four times for Poland national football team from 1923 to 1925. He represented Poland at 1924 Summer Olympics.

References

External links
 Wawrzyniec Cyl on pkol.pl 

1900 births
1974 deaths
Polish footballers
Poland international footballers
ŁKS Łódź players
Olympic footballers of Poland
Footballers at the 1924 Summer Olympics
Footballers from Łódź
People from Piotrków Governorate
Association football defenders
Association football forwards